Jenny Joseph  (7 May 1932 – 15 April 2018) was an English poet, best known for the poem "Warning".

Early life and education

Jennifer Ruth Joseph was born on 7 May 1932 in South Hill, Carpenter Road, Edgbaston, Birmingham to Florence (née Cotton) and Louis Joseph, an antiques dealer. The family were non-observant Jews. Her father's career led to the family relocating to Buckinghamshire, and Joseph was evacuated to Devon early during the Second World War. She later credited this experience with her fascination with the changing light.

She attended Badminton school in Bristol. She won a scholarship to study English literature at St Hilda's College, Oxford (1950).

Career 
Her poems were first published when she was at university in the early 1950s. She became a journalist and worked for the Bedfordshire Times, the Oxford Mail and Drum Publications (Johannesburg, South Africa).

Her first book of poems, The Unlooked-for Season, won a Gregory Award in 1960 and she won a Cholmondeley Award for her second collection, Rose in the Afternoon, in 1974.

"Warning" 
Joseph's best known poem, "Warning", was written in 1961 when she was 28. First published in The Listener in 1962, "Warning" was later included in her 1974 collection Rose In the Afternoon, in The Oxford Book of Twentieth Century English Verse, and in her Selected Poems (1992). 

The poem became well known in America after Liz Carpenter, (formerly the first woman executive assistant to Vice President Lyndon Baines Johnson and Press Secretary to former First Lady Lady Bird Johnson), wrote an article for the Reader's Digest in the early 1980s, about enjoying life having recovered from an illness, closing the article with "Warning". The poem was adopted by the greeting-card industry, led by graphic designer and calligrapher Elizabeth Lucas. Joseph ascribed the popularity of the poem "to her business acumen and energy I owe a hospitable following in California and later throughout northern America, more social, as I said, than literary. 

"Warning" was identified as the UK's "most popular post-war poem" in a 1996 poll by the BBC. 

The opening lines "When I am an old woman I shall wear purple, With a red hat which doesn't go, and doesn't suit me" was the inspiration for the Red Hat Society. 

Due to its popularity, an illustrated gift edition of "Warning", first published by Souvenir Press Ltd in 1997, has now been reprinted 41 times. "Warning" was included in the anthology Tools of the Trade: Poems for new doctors (Scottish Poetry Library, 2014) and a copy was given to all graduating doctors in Scotland in 2014.

Joseph herself hated the colour purple, which is why she included it in the poem.

In 2021 the Bodleian Libraries in Oxford announced that the one millionth image from their collections to be digitised by the Digital Bodleian project was Joseph's first draft of "Warning".

Personal life 
In 1961 Joseph married Charles Coles. The couple had three children, Martin, Nell and Bec and ran the Greyhound, a west London pub, whilst Joseph continued writing. They eventually divorced and Joseph retired to Gloucestershire. Her dedication of The Thinking Heart (1978) was "To my children, preventers of literature, life-savers".

Awards and honours
 1960 Gregory Award  for Unlooked-for Season 
 1974  Cholmondeley Award for Rose in the Afternoon 
 1986 James Tait Black Memorial Prize for her fiction Persephone 
 1995 Travelling scholarship by the Society of Authors.  
 1999 Fellowship of the Royal Society of Literature in 1999.

Bibliography
Unlooked-for Season (1960 – winner of a Gregory Award)
Rose in the Afternoon (1974 – winner of a Cholmondeley Award)
The Thinking Heart (1978)
Beyond Descartes (1983)
Persephone (1986 – fiction in verse and prose)
Beached Boats (1992 – prose)
The Inland Sea (1992)
Selected Poems (1992) – which includes ("Warning")
Ghosts and Other Company (1996)
Extended Similes (1997 – prose fiction)
Warning (1997, illustrated gift edition)
 All the Things I See (2000)
Led by the Nose (2002)
Extreme of Things (2006)
Nothing Like Love (2009)

Commemoration 
The Oxford Dictionary of National Biography published an entry for Jenny Joseph in March 2022.

References

External links 

 Poetry Archive profile and poems written and audio 
 Jenny Joseph Bloodaxe profile  
 Article on Jenny Joseph 
 Interview by BBC  25 February 2004	

1932 births
2018 deaths
English women poets
English Jews
Jewish poets
People from Birmingham, West Midlands
Alumni of St Hilda's College, Oxford
Fellows of the Royal Society of Literature
James Tait Black Memorial Prize recipients
20th-century English poets
20th-century English women writers
21st-century English poets
21st-century English women writers
People from Edgbaston